SMASH is a cryptographic hash function which was created by Lars R. Knudsen.  SMASH comes in two versions: 256-bit and 512-bit. Each version was supposed to rival SHA-256 and SHA-512, respectively, however, shortly after the SMASH presentation at FSE 2005, an attack vector against SMASH was discovered which left the hash broken.

Specifications 
The message length was limited to less than 2128 for SMASH-256 and 2256 for SMASH-512.

Definition 

Input: 256/512-bit message blocks  and 

 
 
 

The function f is a complex compression function consisting of H-Rounds and L-Rounds using S-boxes, linear diffusion and variable rotations, details can be found here

Details 
The S-boxes in SMASH are derived versions from the Serpent ones.

References 

Cryptographic hash functions